Fibroblast growth factor receptor substrate 2 is a protein that in humans is encoded by the FRS2 gene.

FRS2 is an 80 kDa membrane-anchored signal transducing adaptor protein (STAP) that links specific activated Receptor Tyrosine Kinases (RTKs) to multiple downstream signaling pathways, most notably the MAPK/ERK, PI3K/AKT/mTOR and PLCγ pathways. It is overexpressed and amplified in several cancer types, including prostate cancer.

Interactions 

FRS2 has been shown to interact with:

 CBL 
 FGFR1 
 GRB2 
 PRKCI 
 PTPN11 
 SOS1
 TrkA 
 ALK

References

Further reading